The 1997 Marlboro 500 was the 17th and last round of the 1997 CART season. It happened on September 28, 1997, at the then brand-new California Speedway.

Qualifying

Brazilian PacWest Racing driver Maurício Gugelmin set the pole with 240.942 mph (387.759 km).

Race

Before the start
All American Racers's Juan Manuel Fangio II did not start the race due a fire on the back of his car. 1st caution even before the start.

Lap 10 - Lap 52
Chip Ganassi Racing Dutch driver Arie Luyendyk, who was replacing series champion Alex Zanardi, had a pit problem, his car was on fire, but he was able to remain in the race. The restart came out at lap 12. But one lap later, Paul Tracy had a serious crash at turn 4. The 2nd caution came out. It was Tracy's 6th DNF in the season. At lap 14, the top 6 was: Maurício Gugelmin, Jimmy Vasser, Bryan Herta, Michel Jourdain Jr., Michael Andretti and Mark Blundell. Restart came out at lap 23. At lap 40, German driver Arnd Meier spun at turn 4. Arie Luyendyk couldn't avoid him and Arie hit Arnd car. Both drivers suffered slight injuries. At lap 47, Al Unser Jr. had a pit problem, just like Arie had laps before. He retired. Restart came out at lap 52, with Andretti leading the field.

Lap 59 - Lap 106
The top 6 at lap 59 was: Michael Andretti, Maurício Gugelmin, Jimmy Vasser, André Ribeiro, Mark Blundell and Greg Moore. After pitstops, Ribeiro leads on lap 90. After 106 laps, Michael Andretti retired.

Lap 119 - 133
4th caution came out at lap 119 because of debris. Restart came out at lap 126. At lap 133, the top 6 was: André Ribeiro, Gil de Ferran, Adrian Fernández, Jimmy Vasser, Greg Moore and Mark Blundell.

Closing stages: 98 laps to go until the finish
With 98 laps to go, Adrian Fernandez stalled in the pits, but kept the engine running, and remained in the race. With 47 laps to go, André Ribeiro's car was out of fuel, but he went to the pits, crawling his car to his pit area. He came back to the track in 6th, 1 lap behind. But 5 laps later, Ribeiro suffered a bad crash at turn 2 and stopped after crashing in the infield wall. He walked away. 5th caution. With 35 laps to go, Maurício Gugelmin takes the lead, as the restart came out. With 32 laps to go the top 10 was: Maurício Gugelmin, Gil de Ferran, Jimmy Vasser, Greg Moore, Mark Blundell, Bobby Rahal, Adrian Fernandez, Christian Fittipaldi, Scott Pruett and Robby Gordon. With 19 laps to go, Gugelmin had tyre problems, and the new leader was Greg Moore, but 8 laps later, Greg Moore had flames on the back of his car. Jimmy Vasser thought the yellow flag was out, but only thought, as Mark Blundell took the lead. Blundell won for the last time in CART. Jimmy Vasser finished second.

Final Results
Mark Blundell
Jimmy Vasser
Adrian Fernández
Maurício Gugelmin
Bobby Rahal
Gil de Ferran
Scott Pruett
Robby Gordon
Christian Fittipaldi
P. J. Jones
Parker Johnstone
Max Papis

Point Standings
Alex Zanardi 195 points
Gil de Ferran 162 points
Jimmy Vasser 144 points
Maurício Gugelmin 132 points
Paul Tracy 121 points
Mark Blundell 115 points
Greg Moore 111 points
Michael Andretti 108 points
Scott Pruett 102 points
Raul Boesel 91 points
Bryan Herta 72 points
Bobby Rahal 70 points

Rookie of the Year standings
Patrick Carpentier 27 points
Gualter Salles 10 points
Dario Franchitti 10 points
Arnd Meier 1 point

Notes
Last win - Mark Blundell
Fastest lap - Greg Moore: 30.900 seconds
Last Race for Penske Racing - Paul Tracy
Last Race - Arie Luyendyk, Parker Johnstone, Juan Manuel Fangio II
 Alex Zanardi was replaced by Arie Luyendyk after two bad crashes on free practice. Rookie of the year, Patrick Carpentier also did not start.
 Robby Gordon replaced Dario Franchitti in this race.

References

Marlboro 500
Marlboro 500
MAVTV 500